Edward T. Noland (March 24, 1847 – June 20, 1926) was an American politician. He served as the State Treasurer of Missouri from 1889 to 1890.

References

State treasurers of Missouri
Missouri Democrats
1847 births
1926 deaths